Sher Singh Ghubaya (born 10 June 1962) is an Indian politician who was a member of the Lok Sabha, elected from Firozpur constituency of Punjab in 2009 and 2014, as a member of Akali Dal. He is currently (as of 2021) a member of the Indian National Congress.
Being a Member of Parliament and representing a constituency which comprises wholly or partly the cantonment area i.e. Ferozepur, as per section 12(9) of the Cantonments Act, 2006 he is also special invitee for the meetings of the Cantonment Board Ferozepur but without a right to vote. In March 2019, he resigned from Shiromani Akali Dal
and officially joined the Indian National Congress in presence of party president Rahul Gandhi.

He had represented  Jalalabad seat in Punjab Vidhan Sabha as well when he was with Akali Dal.

References

External links
 Official biographical sketch in Parliament of India website

Living people
1962 births
Indian Sikhs
People from Firozpur district
Shiromani Akali Dal politicians
Lok Sabha members from Punjab, India
India MPs 2009–2014
India MPs 2014–2019